Cândido Alves Moreira da Costa (born 30 April 1981) is a Portuguese former footballer who played mainly as a right winger.

He amassed Primeira Liga totals of 162 games and four goals over ten seasons, representing in the competition Salgueiros, Porto, Vitória de Setúbal, Braga and Belenenses. He also competed professionally in England and Romania.

Club career
Costa was born in São João da Madeira, Aveiro District. Having started his football career with the youth teams of S.L. Benfica, he switched to FC Porto after a brief stint with S.C. Salgueiros (where he made his Primeira Liga debut, in 1999–2000). In his first full season at Porto he contributed with 18 games and two goals in the league, but the title was lost in the penultimate round to neighbours Boavista FC.

After not being able to fully break into the first team (having also served a six-month loan stint at Vitória F.C. and a full one with Derby County of the Football League Championship, the latter in the 2003–04 campaign, where he scored once against West Bromwich Albion), Costa joined S.C. Braga for 2004–05, also not being successful in two seasons – a combined 29 league appearances.

Costa, who had started his career as a winger, joined C.F. Os Belenenses in the 2006–07 season, ultimately reconverting into the right back position and becoming an undisputed starter for the Lisbon-based team, with nearly 75 league matches in his first three years, scoring against F.C. Paços de Ferreira on 18 March 2007 in a 2–0 away win.

After only appearing in 11 games in the 2009–10 season due to constant injuries, with Belenenses returning to the second level, 29-year-old Costa had his second abroad experience, signing with Liga I side FC Rapid București.

Honours
Porto
Primeira Liga: 2002–03
Taça de Portugal: 2000–01, 2002–03
Supertaça Cândido de Oliveira: Runner-up 2000
UEFA Cup: 2002–03

References

External links

1981 births
Living people
People from São João da Madeira
Portuguese footballers
Association football defenders
Association football midfielders
Primeira Liga players
Liga Portugal 2 players
Segunda Divisão players
A.D. Sanjoanense players
S.C. Salgueiros players
FC Porto B players
FC Porto players
Vitória F.C. players
S.C. Braga players
C.F. Os Belenenses players
F.C. Arouca players
C.D. Tondela players
A.D. Ovarense players
English Football League players
Derby County F.C. players
Liga I players
FC Rapid București players
UEFA Cup winning players
Portugal youth international footballers
Portugal under-21 international footballers
Portuguese expatriate footballers
Expatriate footballers in England
Expatriate footballers in Romania
Portuguese expatriate sportspeople in England
Portuguese expatriate sportspeople in Romania
Sportspeople from Aveiro District